Bilal Mohamad Saada Cheikh El Najjarine (born 8 February 1981), or simply Bilal El Najjarine, is a Lebanese former professional footballer who played as a centre-back.

At club level he most notably played for Nejmeh, also playing in India and the United Arab Emirates. He represented Lebanon internationally between 2004 and 2015.

Club career 
El Najjarine joined Nejmeh on 18 August 2003. After eight years, he moved to NSW Premier League side Bankstown City Lions in June 2011, making his debut on 19 June in a 1–0 win over Rockdale City Suns. He played three league games in total.

In 2012, El Najjarine moved to Indian I-League side Churchill Brothers on a one-year contract. He made his debut on 6 October 2012, in their 2–0 defeat to Dempo. He appeared in fifteen league matches and scored a goal during the 2012–13 I-League season, as the club clinched its second league title under the guidance of manager Mariano Dias.

Career statistics

International 
Scores and results list Lebanon's goal tally first, score column indicates score after each El Najjarine goal.

Honours 
Nejmeh
 Lebanese Premier League: 2001–02, 2003–04, 2004–05, 2008–09
 Lebanese FA Cup: 2015–16; runner-up: 2002–03, 2003–04, 2011–12
 Lebanese Elite Cup: 2001, 2002, 2003, 2004, 2005, 2016
 Lebanese Super Cup: 2002, 2004, 2009, 2016
 AFC Cup runner-up: 2005

Churchill Brothers
 I-League: 2012–13

Individual
 Lebanese Premier League Best Player: 2011–12
 Lebanese Premier League Team of the Season: 2008–09, 2009–10, 2011–12

See also
 List of Lebanon international footballers

References

External links 

 
 Bilal El Najjarine at RSSSF
 
 

1981 births
Living people
Lebanese footballers
Association football central defenders
Sportspeople from Tripoli, Lebanon
Nejmeh SC players
Bankstown City FC players
Churchill Brothers FC Goa players
Dibba FC players
Al Dhafra FC players
Lebanese Premier League players
I-League players
UAE Pro League players
Lebanon international footballers
Lebanese expatriate footballers
Lebanese expatriate sportspeople in Australia
Lebanese expatriate sportspeople in India
Lebanese expatriate sportspeople in the United Arab Emirates
Expatriate soccer players in Australia
Expatriate footballers in India
Expatriate footballers in the United Arab Emirates